Desmond Patrick Neil Wigan  is a British diplomat who was UK Ambassador to Somalia from 2013 to 2015. Since 13 June 2019, he serves as the British ambassador to Israel, replacing David Quarrey.

Personal life
Wigan studied at the University of Oxford, where he earned a Bachelor of Arts in History. He also has an MSc in Economics from the University of London and a Post-Graduate Diploma from the School of Advanced International Studies at Johns Hopkins University.

Wigan is married, and has two children. His wife, Yael, is Israeli, and he can speak basic Hebrew, which he learned from his wife and from watching Israeli shows on Netflix.

Career
Wigan joined the London-based Foreign and Commonwealth Office in 2000. He initially was an Advisor in charge of UK's Economic Policies in the European Union, a position he held for two years. From August 2002 to January 2006, he was the Head of the Political Section at the British Embassy in Tel Aviv, Israel. Wigan subsequently acted as the Head of the Middle East and North Africa Group in London between February 2006 and April 2008. He later was the Deputy Director for Wider World in the Cabinet Office's Foreign and Defence Policy Secretariat. In March 2010, he was also named as the UK Ambassador to the Democratic Republic of Congo.

In June 2013, Wigan was appointed as the UK Ambassador to Somalia, based at the British Embassy in Mogadishu. On 16 March 2015, Harriet Mathews was appointed as Wigan's successor as Ambassador; Wigan was to be transferred to another Diplomatic Service appointment.

Wigan was appointed Officer of the Order of the British Empire (OBE) in the 2016 New Year Honours.

Wigan became Britain's ambassador to Israel in June 2019.

References

External links

Living people
Ambassadors of the United Kingdom to Somalia
Ambassadors of the United Kingdom to the Democratic Republic of the Congo
Ambassadors of the United Kingdom to the Republic of the Congo
Alumni of the University of Oxford
Alumni of the University of London
Johns Hopkins University alumni
Officers of the Order of the British Empire
Year of birth missing (living people)
Ambassadors of the United Kingdom to Israel